Atalanta was a  steam yacht built in Philadelphia by William Cramp & Sons in 1883 for the financier Jay Gould.

History
Atalanta was built for Jay Gould the same year that American Yacht Club was founded and its inclusion in the club's fleet of steamships was considered a great coup.  Gould died in 1892, and it was sold to the Venezuelan Navy in 1900 where it served as the gunboat Restaurador (Restorer).  It was captured by the Imperial German Navy during the Venezuelan crisis of 1902–03 and put into service under a German flag as part of the blockading squadron. After the crisis, it was returned to the Venezuelans. It was renamed General Salom and continued in service until 1950.

Gallery

References

1883 ships
Gilded Age
Gould family
Gunboats of the Imperial German Navy
Steamships of the United States
Steam yachts
Patrol vessels of Venezuela
Ships built by William Cramp & Sons